Andrei Anatolyevich Novgorodov (born 18 May 1969) is a former Russian professional footballer.

Club career
He made his professional debut in the Soviet Second League in 1986 for FC Dynamo-2 Moscow. He played 4 games in the UEFA Intertoto Cup 1998 for FC Shinnik Yaroslavl.

Honours
 Russian Cup winner: 1993.

References

1969 births
Footballers from Moscow
Living people
Soviet footballers
Russian footballers
Association football midfielders
Association football defenders
Russian Premier League players
FC Dynamo Moscow players
FC Asmaral Moscow players
FC Torpedo Moscow players
FC Torpedo-2 players
FC Zhemchuzhina Sochi players
FC Shinnik Yaroslavl players